Operation Cross Eagles or American Cross Eagles is an action thriller set during the Second World War. The mid-budget film was made in 1968 and was directed by Richard Conte (his only time as a Director)  who stars in the film alongside Rory Calhoun.

The film is largely filmed on location in Yugoslavia.

Plot
An American military courier, a Captain, is captured in Yugoslavia during the Second World War. He is rumoured to carry the plans for the Allied invasion and capture of the Balkans, known as Operation Cross Eagles. His courteous captor is Rear Admiral Von Vogels (Relja Basic).

A small group of American commandoes, led by Lt Bradford, are sent to capture a German colonel (Col. Streich) in order to exchange him for the courier.

The Yugoslavian authorities become aware of the plan.

Bradford and McAfee enter the Nazi-held fort dressed as monks, and pretend to sell fruit. As they are discovered their troop open fire. They successfully capture Col. Streich.

The colonel is left in a lagoon on the Adriatic to be picked up by Nazi troops.

Bradford and McAfee infiltrate the villa where the British captain is held by Admiral von Vogels. Cpl Bell (Demeter Bitenc) betrays the Americans and tries to stop them taking the Admiral. Once captured they explain the rumour of Operation Cros Eagles was just a smoke-screen and all they actually wanted was the admiral.

Cast

Richard Conte as Lt. Bradford
Rory Calhoun as Sgt. Sean McAfee
Relja Basic as Admiral von Vogels
Aili King as Anna
Rada Djuricin as Fulda
Phil Brown as Sgt. Turley
Demeter Bitenc as Cpl. Bell

References

1968 films
1968 war films
Yugoslav war films
English-language Yugoslav films
Films set in Yugoslavia
War films set in Partisan Yugoslavia
Yugoslav World War II films
1960s English-language films